The demi-culverin was a medium cannon similar to but slightly larger than a saker and smaller than a regular culverin developed in the late 16th century. It required  of black powder to fire an  round shot (though there were heavier variants firing  or  round shot).

Demi-culverins were valued by generals for their range, accuracy and effectiveness. They were often used in sieges for wall and building demolition.

References 

Cannon